Association Sportive Togo-Port is a Togolese football club based in Lomé. They play in the top division in Togolese football. Their home stadium is Stade Agoè-Nyivé.

In 2005–07 Tiliwa Kidiba born the 11 October 1984 was AS Togo Port striker with 30 goals in 54 matches and has permitted AS Togo Port FC to win the championship 2006.

Achievements
Togolese Championnat National: 1
Champions: 2017
Coupe du Togo: 2
Winner: 2006, 2017
Runners-up: 2016

External links
Team profile - Togo Port website

Football clubs in Togo
Football clubs in Lomé